Nikos Karoulias (born 7 February 1954) is a Greek former professional footballer who played as a left back and a former manager.

Club career
Karoulias started his football career at the academies of AEK Athens, where in 1973 he was promoted to the men's team under Stan Anderson. In the summer of 1974 he transferred to Apollon Athens, as an exchange for the transfer of Christos Ardizoglou, where he remained for six years.

The big leap in his career took place in the summer of 1980, when he transferred to Panathinaikos. He was distinguished for his spirited game, while the highlight of his career was his participation as a starter in the team that reached the semi-finals of the European Cup in 1985. At Panathinaikos he won 2 Championships and 4 Greek Cups and a Greek Super Cup including 2 domestic doubles in 1984 and 1986. He played in the "greens" until the 1988, when he retired at the age of 34.

International career
Karoulias played for the first time with Greece on 14 October 1981, in the home match against Denmark (2-3), for the qualifiers of the 1982 FIFA World Cup. He participated in a total of 31 matches, scoring 1 goal.

Managerial career
After he retired as a footballer, Karoulias followed a career as a coach, with his most important moment being his brief presence at the bench of Panathinaikos in 1997, while he has also worked in other clubs, including Athinaikos, Panargiakos, Olympiakos Nicosia, Anorthosis Famagusta, Proodeftiki, Kallithea and Apollon Smyrnis fron 1996 until 2011.

Honours

Panathinaikos
Alpha Ethniki: 1983–84, 1985–86
Greek Cup: 1981–82, 1983–84, 1985–86, 1987–88
Greek Super Cup: 1988

References

External links

1954 births
Living people
Greek footballers
AEK Athens F.C. players
Apollon Smyrnis F.C. players
Panathinaikos F.C. players
Greek football managers
Proodeftiki F.C. managers
Athinaikos F.C. managers
Kallithea F.C. managers
Apollon Smyrnis F.C. managers
Association football midfielders
Greece international footballers
People from Samos
Sportspeople from the North Aegean